Mezang (also known as Mazra‘eh Mazang and Mezank) is a village in Aliabad Rural District, in the Central District of Taft County, Yazd Province, Iran. At the 2006 census, its population was 73, in 24 families.

References 

Populated places in Taft County